The Memphis Tigers women's basketball team represents the University of Memphis in NCAA Division I women's college basketball. The Tigers compete in the American Athletic Conference. They previously competed in Conference USA in which they have won two Conference USA conference tournament championships and, prior to that two Metro Conference tournament championships. They play home games at the Elma Roane Fieldhouse and FedExForum.

History

The first inter-school game of the Memphis Tigers (then West Tennessee State Normal School) was a 24–0 win over Whitehaven High School in 1914. The University dropped women's athletics in 1936 and did not return women's athletics to varsity sport status until the 1972–73 season.

The team has competed in the NCAA tournament seven times., the WNIT five times, the National Women's Invitational tournament one time and the Women's Basketball Invitational one time.

Head coaches

Year by year results
TCWSF—Tennessee College Women's Sports Federation
—Conference tournament winners
Source

|-style="background: #ffffdd;"
| colspan="8" align="center" | Metro Conference

|-style="background: #ffffdd;"
| colspan="8" align="center" | Great Midwest Conference

|-style="background: #ffffdd;"
| colspan="8" align="center" | Conference USA‡

|-style="background: #ffffdd;"
| colspan="8" align="center" | American Athletic Conference

NCAA tournament results

See also
 Memphis Tigers men's basketball

References

External links
 Official website